China Everbright Bank Co., Ltd. is one of twelve Chinese joint-stock commercial bank. Established in August 1992, it is a national joint-stock commercial bank approved by the State Council and approved by the People's Bank of China, headquartered in Beijing. It was ranked in 139th in 2016 Forbes Global 2000 publicly held companies. Sister company Everbright Securities ranked 862th.

As of August 2016, it was a constituent of the Hang Seng China 50 Index for all Chinese companies among the three stock exchanges of China, as well as a constituent of the FTSE China A50 Index among two stock exchanges in mainland China and lastly a constituent of the SSE 50 Index of Shanghai. The bank also a constituent of the CSI 300 Index (and its sub-index CSI 100 Index) and other indices.

Shareholders
China Everbright Group and its subsidiaries owned 27.97% stake in the bank, Everbright Group's parent company, Central Huijin Investment owned 21.96% stake directly as the second largest shareholder of the bank. Moreover, the directors in the board of Everbright Group that nominated by Central Huijin Investment, were also nominated as the directors of the bank (as part of the shareholders' agreement from the State Council), thus Central Huijin Investment and China Everbright Group are the intermediate parent company of the bank. The ultimate parent company is the China Investment Corporation, which is supervised by the State Council of the People's Republic of China.

References

External links

 

Companies based in Beijing
Companies listed on the Hong Kong Stock Exchange
Companies listed on the Shanghai Stock Exchange
Banks of China
Banks established in 1992
Government-owned companies of China
Companies in the CSI 100 Index
H shares
China Everbright Group
Chinese brands